Jerome Clifton Dyson (born May 1, 1987) is an American professional basketball player, who lastly played for Spójnia Stargard. He played college basketball with the Connecticut Huskies before playing professionally in the NBA with the New Orleans Hornets, he has also played overseas in Italy, Israel and China. He was the 2012–13 top scorer in the Israel Basketball Premier League. He was also the 2017 Israeli Basketball Premier League Finals MVP.

Early life and college
Dyson grew up in Potomac, Maryland's Scotland neighborhood. He attended Winston Churchill High School in Potomac for his first two years of high school before transferring to Proctor Academy in Andover, New Hampshire for his final two years. While at Proctor, Dyson matured and was recruited to play basketball with the University of Connecticut Huskies under coach Jim Calhoun. During his freshman season at UConn, Dyson was compared by Calhoun to NBA players and UConn alumni Ray Allen and Richard Hamilton. During his sophomore season, he and teammate Doug Wiggins were caught by on-campus police in a car with alcohol. He was eventually reinstated. In February 2009 during his junior year, he tore a lateral meniscus in his right knee in an on-court collision with Syracuse University guard Andy Rautins. At the time of the injury, he had started all 24 games for the Huskies, scoring in double figures 18 times and averaging 13.2 points per game. He returned the following season and scored 17.7 points and 4.4 assists per game. In March 2010, the Sporting News named Dyson their 2010 Comeback Player of the Year.

Professional career

2010–11 season
Dyson went undrafted in the 2010 NBA draft and played with the Cleveland Cavaliers and Oklahoma City Thunder during the 2010 summer league and preseason before being cut. He then signed with the Thunder's NBA Development League affiliate, the Tulsa 66ers. He appeared in 47 games with the 66ers, starting 10. He averaged 15.5 points and 27.3 minutes per game and was the team's leading scorer. Following the season, Dyson was named to the United States men's national basketball team for the 2011 Pan American Games in Guadalajara, Mexico. Dyson averaged 11.4 points, including a team high 19 against Uruguay. The team, composed entirely of non-NBA players due to the 2011 NBA lockout, finished with the bronze medal.

2011–12 season
On December 9, Dyson was among nine players added to the training camp roster of the New Orleans Hornets. He did not make their final roster, and returned to the 66ers. However, the Hornets signed him to a ten-day contract on April 10, 2012. During his nine-game stint with the Hornets, he would average 7.4 points, 2.1 rebounds, 2.0 assists, and 1.2 steals per game. He would also start for them for one game.

2012–13 season
On July 27, 2012, Dyson was traded to the Phoenix Suns in a three-team deal. He was waived by the Suns on August 15, 2012. Later that year, he signed a one-year deal with Hapoel Holon to play in Israel.  He was the 2012–13 top scorer in the Israel Basketball Premier League.

2013–14 season
Dyson played with the Charlotte Bobcats during the 2013 NBA Summer League. After the summer league ended, he signed a one-year deal with Enel Brindisi to play in Italy.

2014–15 season
On July 10, 2014, he signed with the Italian Euroleague team Dinamo Sassari for the 2014–15 season. Here, he won the Italian SuperCup, the Italian Cup and the Italian Championship, in a seven game series against Pallacanestro Reggiana

2015–16 season
On November 23, 2015, he signed with the Italian League team Auxilium CUS Torino for the rest of the season.

2016–17 season
On July 12, 2016, Dyson returned to Israel and signed a two-year deal with Hapoel Jerusalem. During that season, Dyson won Israeli League Cup with Jerusalem, as well as reaching the EuroCup semifinals.

On June 15, 2017, Dyson recorded a season-high 30 points, along with 6 rebounds, 5 assists and 2 steals in the championship final game against Maccabi Haifa, leading Jerusalem to win the 2017 Israeli League Championship after an 83–76 victory, he was later named Finals MVP.

2017–18 season
On July 4, 2017, Dyson signed a one-year contract extension with Jerusalem. On December 16, 2017, Dyson recorded 29 points, 3 rebounds and 3 assists, including a game-winning layup with 10.9 seconds left in an 88–86 win over Hapoel Holon. On January 15, 2018, Dyson recorded a season-high 30 points, shooting 8-for-11 from the three-point range, along with 5 assists and 3 steals, in a 92–78 win over Maccabi Rishon LeZion.

During his second season with Jerusalem, Dyson participated in the Israeli League All-Star Game and the Three-Point Shootout during the same event. He was named three-time MVP of the Round. On June 8, 2018, Dyson was named 2018 All-Israeli League First Team.

Dyson led Jerusalem to the 2018 Israeli League Final Four, where they eventually lost to Hapoel Holon. In 47 games played during the 2017–18 season (played in the Israeli League and the EuroCup), Dyson averaged 16.6 points, 4 rebounds, 3.3 assists and 1.6 steals per game.

2018–19 season
On July 8, 2018, Dyson signed with the Chinese team Jiangsu Dragons for the 2018–19 season. However, In November 2018, Dyson parted ways with Jiangsu after appearing in six games due to a thumb injury.

On February 10, 2019, Dyson returned to Israel for a third stint, joining Bnei Herzliya for the rest of the season. In 15 games played for Herzliya, he averaged 17.2 points, 3.2 rebounds, 3.7 assists and 1.8 steals per game.

2019–20 season
On July 26, 2019, Dyson returned to Italy for a second stint, signing with Virtus Roma for the 2019–20 season. On February 26 he transferred to Fortitudo Bologna that was looking for someone to replace Kassius Robertson who was injured with the Canadian national team during the 2021 FIBA AmeriCup qualifiers.

2020–21 season
On December 25, 2020, he has signed with Spójnia Stargard of the PLK.

The Basketball Tournament
In 2017, Dyson played for The CITI Team of The Basketball Tournament. The Basketball Tournament is an annual $2 million winner-take-all tournament broadcast on ESPN.

Career statistics

EuroLeague

|-
| style="text-align:left;"| 2014–15
| style="text-align:left;"| Sassari
| 10 || 10 || 23.9 || .353 || .289 || .531 || 2.5 || 3.0 || 1.7 || .1 || 10.2 || 5.9
|- class="sortbottom"
| colspan=2 style="text-align:center;"| Career
| 10 || 10 || 23.9 || .353 || .289 || .531 || 2.5 || 3.0 || 1.7 || .1 || 10.2 || 5.9

NBA

|-
| align="left" | 
| align="left" | New Orleans
| 9 || 1 || 20.0 || .396 || .125 || .778 || 2.1 || 2.0 || 1.2 || .2 || 7.4
|-
| colspan=2 align="center" | Career
| 9 || 1 || 20.0 || .396 || .125 || .778 || 2.1 || 2.0 || 1.2 || .2 || 7.4

Personal
Dyson's mother, Julie, is a pastor at the Immanuel Church of God in Germantown, Maryland. He has two children.

References

External links
 Career statistics and player information from NBA.com 

 Jerome Dyson at euroleague.net
 Jerome Dyson at fiba.com
 Jerome Dyson at legabasket.it
 Jerome Dyson at realgm.com

1987 births
Living people
American expatriate basketball people in China
American expatriate basketball people in Israel
American expatriate basketball people in Italy
American men's basketball players
Auxilium Pallacanestro Torino players
Basketball players at the 2011 Pan American Games
Basketball players from Maryland
Bnei Hertzeliya basketball players
Dinamo Sassari players
Hapoel Holon players
Hapoel Jerusalem B.C. players
Jiangsu Dragons players
Lega Basket Serie A players
Medalists at the 2011 Pan American Games
New Basket Brindisi players
New Orleans Hornets players
Pallacanestro Virtus Roma players
Pan American Games bronze medalists for the United States
Pan American Games medalists in basketball
People from Potomac, Maryland
Shooting guards
Sportspeople from Rockville, Maryland
Tulsa 66ers players
UConn Huskies men's basketball players
Undrafted National Basketball Association players